Frontera is a 1980 Mexican action thriller film directed by Fernando Durán Rojas and starring Fernando Allende, Daniela Romo, and Guillermo Capetillo.

Plot 
A young man wants to know the world and travels to the frontier between Mexico and the U.S. in search of his brother. Upon arrival, he realizes that his brother has died in an accident of bizarre characteristics. Anyway, he decides to stay and continues the business with his brother's girlfriend, together they will try to rebuild a restaurant with the help from family and friends. But everything is complicated when the mafia and drug dealers attack the project as it moves.

Cast 
 Fernando Allende as Fernando
 Daniela Romo as Rosy
 Guillermo Capetillo
 Gilberto Román
 Carlos Rivera
 Raymundo Bravo
 Carlos Riquelme
 Jorge Fegán
 Jorge Reynoso
 Mike Moroff
 Guillermo Lagunes
 Manuel Fregoso
 Manolo Cárdenas
 José Luis Avendaño
 José Wilhelmy

Production 
The film was shot in 1979.

Release 
The film was released on 15 May 1980. It was screened at the Cuautitlán Izcalli 2, Carrusel, Colonial, Dolores del Río, International, Marina, Olimpia, Soledad, Lago 1 and Elvira cinemas, for two weeks.

References

External links 
 

1980 films
1980s Spanish-language films
1980 action thriller films
Mexican action thriller films
1980s Mexican films